Gilberto de la Nuez (1913–1993) was a Cuban outsider painter and woodcut maker. Much of his work depicts themes taken from santería; he was also concerned with documenting Cuban history and customs. During his life he was a marginal figure in Cuban art; his stature has only risen somewhat after his death.

References
Veerle Poupeye. Caribbean Art. London; Thames and Hudson; 1998.

1913 births
1993 deaths
20th-century Cuban painters
20th-century Cuban male artists
Male painters